Richard Lee Eber (born April 17, 1945) is a former gridiron football wide receiver who played for the Atlanta Falcons and San Diego Chargers of the National Football League (NFL). He also played for (CFL) Saskatchewan Roughriders, (WFL) Houston Texans and Shreveport Steamer. He played college football at University of Tulsa.

References 

1945 births
Living people
Players of American football from Torrance, California
American football wide receivers
Atlanta Falcons players
San Diego Chargers players
Saskatchewan Roughriders players
Houston Texans (WFL) players
Shreveport Steamer players
Tulsa Golden Hurricane football players